Jeremy Johnson is a technology entrepreneur and the co-founder and CEO of Andela, a US company based in Africa that connects talented African software developers with foreign companies, like Upwork. He is also the President of Strategic Initiatives at 2U,  an educational technology company.

He serves on the board of the Young Entrepreneur Council and the education non-profit PENCIL and was listed as Forbes 30 Under 30 in 2013 and 2014.

Education 
Johnson dropped out of Princeton University when he was 21 to build his business.

Career 
Before Andela, Johnson had co-founded 2U, one of the fastest growing education technology startups. and in 2014 he co-founded Andela with Ian Carnevale, Iyinoluwa Aboyeji and Christina Sass as a training company to match developers in emerging markets now known as technology hubs

References 

Living people
Web developers
Company founders
Year of birth missing (living people)